Joculator pulvis is a species of minute sea snail, a marine gastropod mollusc in the family Cerithiopsidae. The species was described by Issel in 1869.

References

Gastropods described in 1869
pulvis